Charles-Louis Michelez (1817 – May 21, 1894) was a French Photographer and a Lithographer.

Biography 
Charles-Louis Michelez was born in Paris, the son of Charles Louis and Félicité Michelez née Morin. He was married to Alicia Roux. 

He took an photograph of the Railway of the Prince Imperial in 1895, which is the oldest known photograph of a model railway in the world.

He then specialized in photographing works of art. In 1861 he exhibited during the National Art Show and Exhibition a series of photographs of Gustave Doré's original drawings for The Inferno in the photography room of the Academic Salon. In 1867 he took five photographs at the Exposition Universelle in Paris.

From 1874 to 1884 he had a photographic studio in Paris.

His photographs

References 

French photographers
1817 births
1894 deaths